The 1990 Open Clarins was a women's tennis tournament played on outdoor clay courts at the Racing Club de France in Paris, France, and was part of the Tier IV category of the 1990 WTA Tour. It was the fourth edition of the tournament and was held from 17 September until 23 September 1990. First-seeded Conchita Martínez won the singles title and earned $27,000 first-prize money.

Finals

Singles
 Conchita Martínez defeated  Patricia Tarabini 7–5, 6–3
 It was Martínez's 1st singles title of the year and the 5th of her career.

Doubles
 Kristin Godridge /  Kirrily Sharpe defeated  Alexia Dechaume /  Nathalie Herreman 4–6, 6–3, 6–1

References

External links
 ITF tournament edition details
 Tournament draws

Open Clarins
Clarins Open
1990 in Paris
1990 in French tennis